Milnes is a surname of British origin, a variant of the surname Mills.

Notable people with that surname include:
 Eric Milnes (born 1959), American harpsichordist, organist and conductor
 Fred Milnes (1878–1946), English footballer
 Richard Slater Milnes (1759-1804), English politician
 Richard Monckton Milnes, 1st Baron Houghton, English poet and politician
 Robert Crewe-Milnes, 1st Marquess of Crewe, English statesman and writer
 Robert Milnes (disambiguation), multiple people
 Rodney Milnes (1936–2015), English opera critic and musicologist
 Sherrill Milnes, American baritone famous for his Verdi roles

Companies
 G.F. Milnes & Co. Tramcar manufacturer of Birkenhead and Hadley, Shropshire

See also 
 Mills (disambiguation)
 Miln
 Milne (disambiguation)
 Milner (disambiguation)
 Mylne

References 

English-language surnames